Mapper(2) is a database of transcription factor binding sites in multiple genomes.

See also
 Transcription factor

References

External links
 http://genome.ufl.edu/mapperdb

Biological databases
Gene expression